Raymond Ferdinand Louis-Philippe Laurent (16 May 1917 – 3 February 2005) was a Belgian herpetologist, who specialized in African and South American amphibians and reptiles. He published more than 200 scientific articles and book chapters. Several species have been named after him, most recently  Phymaturus laurenti in 2010. Additional species of reptiles named in his honor include Chironius laurenti, Liolaemus laurenti, and Mehelya laurenti.

References

Further reading
 (First page freely available online, remainder available to subscribers only).

1917 births
2005 deaths
Belgian herpetologists
20th-century Belgian zoologists